Vendor neutrality in the data centre market refers to a specialised and focused business model, in which a data centre provider limits its activities to a fixed set of value layers in order to avoid conflicts of interest. The provider creates an open market and a platform for others to add value. The provider remains neutral and independent and offers standard open interconnect policies.

Similar concepts

Similar-sounding terms such as telco agnostic and network independent refer mainly to network infrastructure and IP transit services. Vendor neutral goes further, referring to a business model that is independent of all parties who add value further up the chain (e.g., service providers, consultants, disaster recovery solution providers, storage providers).

Value layer abstraction

Vendor neutral data centres focus on the "bottom" layers in the stack of services provided to data centre customers: space, security, power, environment, and cabling. In terms of the OSI model, they provide Layer 1 services.

See also
 Peering

Business models